Napoléon Louis Charles Bonaparte (10 October 1802 – 5 May 1807) was the eldest son of Louis Bonaparte and Hortense de Beauharnais. His father was Emperor Napoleon I's younger brother; his mother was the daughter of  Napoleon's first wife, Joséphine de Beauharnais.

Life
At the time of his birth his uncle was First Consul of France and childless. Napoleon Charles was his eldest nephew and seen as a potential heir, but he died before reaching his fifth birthday on 5 May 1807 of croup.

Napoleon Charles had two brothers: the youngest, Louis Napoleon, eventually became Emperor as Napoleon III in 1852.

The strong attachment that Napoleon showed towards the child, and which was not repeated with his two younger brothers, gave rise to speculation according to which Napoleon-Charles was actually the son of a forbidden relationship between Napoleon and his stepdaughter Hortensia.

Ancestry

References

1802 births
1807 deaths
Napoleon Charles Bonaparte
Napoleon Charles Bonaparte
Sons of kings

Royalty and nobility who died as children